King Country was a New Zealand parliamentary electorate. It existed from 1972 to 1996 and was represented by Jim Bolger of the National Party for those 24 years.

Population centres
There were 84 electorates for the 1969 election, and the 1972 electoral redistribution saw three additional general seats created for the North Island, bringing the total number of electorates to 87. Together with increased urbanisation in Christchurch and Nelson, the changes proved very disruptive to existing electorates. In the South Island, three electorates were abolished, and three electorates were newly created. In the North Island, five electorates were abolished, two electorates were recreated, and six electorates were newly created (including King Country).

The King Country electorate covered a largely rural area with a dispersed population. It has no cities. The largest towns are Ōtorohanga and Te Kuiti.

History
The previous representative of the Waimarino electorate was Roy Jack who transferred to the enlarged  electorate in 1972. David Seath had held the  Waitomo electorate since  and he retired in 1972. This gave Jim Bolger the opportunity to stand in the new King Country electorate when it was formed in 1972, and the area being a traditional stronghold for National, he won the election with ease. Bolger became Prime Minister in 1990 while representing the King Country electorate.

The electorate combined with the adjacent rural electorate of Taranaki in 1996 to form the Taranaki-King Country electorate for MMP.

Election results

Key

1993 election

1990 election

1987 election

1984 election

1981 election

1978 election

1975 election

1972 election

Notes

References

 

Historical electorates of New Zealand
1972 establishments in New Zealand
1996 disestablishments in New Zealand